Mnemosyne is the Greek goddess of memory.

Mnemosyne may also refer to:

57 Mnemosyne, a main belt asteroid
Mnemosyne (album), by Norwegian saxophonist Jan Garbarek featuring the Hilliard Ensemble
Mnemosyne (anime), a Japanese animation series
Mnemosyne: The Parallel Between Literature and the Visual Arts, a book by Mario Praz, published in 1975
Mnemosyne (journal), a journal of classical studies published since 1852, issued by Brill Publishers
Mnemosyne (planthopper) Stål, 1866 an insect genus in the Cixiinae
Mnemosyne (Rossetti), an 1881 painting by Dante Gabriel Rossetti
Mnemosyne (software), a computer assisted learning tool
Parnassius mnemosyne, the binomial name for the clouded Apollo butterfly
Sailor Mnemosyne, a character from the fifth manga arc of Sailor Moon
 Mnemozina (Mnemosyne), a journal published by The Lovers of Wisdom (a Russian society studying German philosophy), 1824–1825